Ridgeland is a city in Madison County, Mississippi, United States. The population was 24,340 at the 2020 census. It is part of the Jackson, Mississippi metropolitan area.

History
In 1805, the Choctaw Indian Agency, headed by Silas Dinsmoor, was located in what is now known as Ridgeland. There is also a neighborhood called Dinsmor in Ridgeland.  The structure was then called Turner Brashear's Stand until about 1850.  It was adapted for use as a hotel named the King's Inn.  During the American Civil War, King's Inn was used as a headquarters by General Stephen Lee.  Afterward, it again operated as a hotel until 1896, when it was destroyed by fire.

In 1853, James B. Yellowley founded the community of Yellowley's Crossing (later named Jessamine after his wife). In 1896, Edward Treakle and Gordon Nichols, two real estate developers from Chicago, purchased the land from Yellowley and established the Highland Colony Company. They created plans for a town to be named Ridgeland and launched an advertising campaign to entice people from the northern United States to move south. Agriculture was the community's dominant revenue source, with pears and strawberries as the leading crops grown for sale.

In the early 20th century, Ridgeland was home to a hotel, sawmill, and a canning company. The main business section of Ridgeland was along Jackson Street, due to the Illinois Central Railroad located on the street. In 1910 a two-room school was created and the schools combined with those of Madison by 1925. In 1961, Ridgeland was predicted to grow a lot more, which turned out to be correct.

Northpark Mall opened in 1984 and brought more growth into the area. Business in Ridgeland improved more in the 1990s when Highland Colony Parkway brought new businesses to the area.

Geography
Ridgeland is located between Madison to the north and Jackson to the south. This suburban city is adjacent to the Ross Barnett Reservoir.

Demographics

2020 census

As of the 2020 United States Census, there were 24,340 people, 10,632 households, and 6,046 families residing in the city.

2010 census
As of the 2010 United States Census, there were 24,047 people living in the city. The racial makeup of the city was 57.5% White, 32.5% Black, 0.2% Native American, 4.0% Asian, <0.1% Pacific Islander, 0.1% from some other race and 1.0% from two or more races. 4.7% were Hispanic or Latino of any race.

2000 census
As of the census of 2000, there were 20,173 people, 9,267 households, and 9,022 families living in the city. The population density was 1,267.4 people per square mile (489.2/km). There were 9,930 housing units at an average density of 623.9 per square mile (240.8/km). The racial makeup of the city was 77.05% White, 18.44% African American, 0.15% Native American, 2.95% Asian, 0.04% Pacific Islander, 0.55% from other races, and 0.82% from two or more races. Hispanic or Latino of any race were 1.55% of the population.

There were 9,267 households, out of which 28.8% had children under the age of 18 living with them, 40.7% were married couples living together, 10.4% had a female householder with no husband present, and 45.8% were non-families. 38.6% of all households were made up of individuals, and 6.5% had someone living alone who was 65 years of age or older. The average household size was 2.15 and the average family size was 2.90.

In the city, the population was spread out, with 23.4% under the age of 18, 10.2% from 18 to 24, 40.3% from 25 to 44, 17.8% from 45 to 64, and 8.2% who were 65 years of age or older. The median age was 32 years. For every 100 females, there were 89.9 males. For every 100 females age 18 and over, there were 86.7 males.

The median incomes for a household in the city was $43,066, and the median income for a family was $59,249. Males had a median income of $40,632 versus $29,634 for females. The per capita income for the city was $28,704. About 5.5% of families and 7.4% of the population were below the poverty line, including 9.2% of those under age 18 and 5.6% of those age 65 or over.

Economy
Bomgar, a tech company, C Spire Wireless, the sixth largest wireless provider in the United States, and Cal-Maine Foods, the largest shell egg producer in the United States, are all headquartered in Ridgeland.

The largest mall in the Jackson metro area, Northpark Mall, is located on County Line Road in Ridgeland. Another shopping center, The Renaissance at Colony Park, is also located in Ridgeland.

Education
Ridgeland is served by the Madison County School District, and has two private schools: Saint Andrew's Episcopal School and Christ Covenant School. The Veritas School was a private school which closed in 2015.

Ridgeland has a campus of Holmes Community College.

Ridgeland is home of the Baptist Children's Village, which provides short-term and long-term care for abandoned, neglected, or abused children and counseling to broken families. Since 2004, the executive director has been Rory Lee, a former college president.

Ridgeland made national headlines in 2022 when mayor Gene F. McGee refused to send $110,000 in approved city funding to the Madison County Library System because the library system contained books that “went against his Christian beliefs”.

Notable people
 Faith Hill was born and raised in Ridgeland until moving to nearby Star when she was in the 8th grade.
 All three family members of The Band Perry were raised in Ridgeland.
 Wesley T. Bishop, member of the Louisiana House of Representatives for District 99 in Orleans Parish; alumnus and criminal justice faculty and administrator at Southern University at New Orleans, former resident of Ridgeland
 George Jackson died in Ridgeland.
 Rubel Phillips, Republican gubernatorial nominee in 1963 and 1967 spent his last years in retirement in Ridgeland.
 Bianca Knight, track and field athlete.
David H. Nutt, lawyer and philanthropist, the richest person in Mississippi as of 2014.

References

Cities in Mississippi
Cities in Madison County, Mississippi
Cities in Jackson metropolitan area, Mississippi
Populated places established in 1805
1805 establishments in Mississippi Territory